The New Hampshire Indy 225 was an IndyCar race at the New Hampshire Motor Speedway in Loudon, New Hampshire.  It was held as a CART Champ Car event from 1992 until 1995, switching to the Indy Racing League for the 1996–97 season.  On June 21, 2010, it was announced that the IndyCar Series would return to New Hampshire for the 2011 season. When the IndyCar Series returned to New Hampshire Motor Speedway the race was scheduled to be 225 laps. A Firestone Indy Lights and NASCAR Whelen Modified Tour race accompanied the feature.  The race did not return for the 2012 IndyCar Series season.

Race results

Race recaps
1996: Scott Sharp won his first career Indycar race, and won the first race for owner A. J. Foyt since the 1981 Pocono 500. Tony Stewart had led 165 laps and had a nearly three-lap lead over second place, but coasted into the pits with 18 laps to go. Scott Sharp took over the lead, and stretched his fuel to the finish.
2011: Indy-style racing returned to New Hampshire after a 13-year sabbatical. The race was scheduled for 225 laps / 238.05 miles. Rain affected the race, bringing out the caution on two lengthy occasions. With 5 laps to go, officials attempted to restart the race and finish under green. The track, however, was too moist for racing, and Danica Patrick immediately spun on the frontstretch, which led to a controversial five-car pileup. Officials accepted blame for the decision, and reverted final scoring back to the previous standings prior to the restart attempt. The official race distance was 215 laps / 227.47 miles.

Indy Lights

USF2000

Whelen Modified Tour (Indy weekend only)
Since 1994, the NASCAR Whelen Modified Tour has joined the open-wheel card, typically racing as part of the Indy weekend.  The series usually participates in all major race weekends at the circuit.

References

External links
Champ Car Stats: New Hampshire archive
Ultimate Racing History: New Hampshire archive

 
Champ Car races
Former IndyCar Series races
Motorsport in New Hampshire
1992 establishments in New Hampshire
2011 disestablishments in New Hampshire